Bards and Sages Quarterly is a quarterly fantasy, horror, and science fiction literary magazine published by Bards and Sages, and edited by Julie Ann Dawson. Its first issue was released in January 2009. It is a semi-professional paying market and publishes short and flash fiction.

The Magazine holds an annual Readers Choice Author or the Year contest. Past winners have included Eugie Foster (2009), Kurt Bachard (2010), Julia Martins (2015) and Deborah Cher (2016).

References

External links
 

Quarterly magazines published in the United States
Science fiction magazines published in the United States
English-language magazines
Fantasy fiction magazines
Horror fiction magazines
Magazines established in 2009
Magazines published in New Jersey